Team Asobi is a Japanese video game developer based in Tokyo. A first-party studio for Sony Interactive Entertainment, Team Asobi was originally formed in 2012 as part of Japan Studio, but formally spun off into an independent studio within Sony's PlayStation Studios in June 2021.

History
Team Asobi was first formed in 2012 as internal part of Japan Studio based in Tokyo by Nicolas Doucet. The team's name is derived from the Japanese word "Asobu", meaning "To Play". After forming, they worked on technical demos and went on to develop The Playroom (2013), a pre-downloaded augmented reality game designed to demonstrate the use of the PlayStation Camera and DualShock 4 for the PlayStation 4. Doucet and several members of his team had been developers for games for the EyeToy and had brought their knowledge forward for use on The Playroom. Team Asobi also created a virtual reality version The Playroom VR to demonstrate the PlayStation VR unit with its release in 2016. The Playroom introduced a small robotic character, then named "A5081" which visually resembles the word "ASOBI", and became the reference for the Astro Bot character used in their later games, Astro Bot Rescue Mission (2018) and Astro's Playroom (2020).

Across late 2020 and early 2021, several staff members of Japan Studio, outside those of Team Asobi, announced their departure; Sony later affirmed that by April 2021, Japan Studio would be refocused around Team Asobi based on the success of Astro's Playroom. In June 2021, Sony announced that Team Asobi had been transitioned to a standalone studio within PlayStation Studios. Doucet remains Asobi's studio director and creative director following this transition.

Games developed

Notes

References

External links
 

Japanese companies established in 2012
2021 establishments in Japan
First-party video game developers
Software companies based in Tokyo
PlayStation Studios
Video game companies established in 2012
Video game companies established in 2021
Video game companies of Japan
Video game development companies